Goodenia sericostachya, commonly known as silky-spiked goodenia, is a species of flowering plant in the family Goodeniaceae and is endemic to a restricted area in the west of Western Australia. It is an erect herb or shrub with silvery hairs, lance-shaped to egg-shaped leaves at the base of the plant and thyrses of blue to pinkish-mauve flowers.

Description
Flowering occurs from October to December or January.

Taxonomy and naming
Goodenia sericostachya was first formally described in 1964 Charles Gardner in the  Journal of the Royal Society of Western Australia from specimens he collected near the Murchison River in 1960. The specific epithet (sericostachya) means "silky flower spike".

Distribution and habitat
This goodenia grows on sandplains, germinating after fire, between Yuna and the lower reaches of the Murchison River in the Carnarvon, Geraldton Sandplains and Yalgoo biogeographic regions of Western Australia.

Conservation status
Goodenia sericostachya is classified is classified as "Priority Three" by the Government of Western Australia Department of Parks and Wildlife meaning that it is poorly known and known from only a few locations but is not under imminent threat.

References

sericostachya
Eudicots of Western Australia
Plants described in 1964
Taxa named by Charles Gardner
Endemic flora of Australia